Eurypygimorphae or Phaethontimorphae is a clade of birds that contains the orders Phaethontiformes (tropicbirds) and Eurypygiformes (kagu and sunbittern) recovered by genome analysis. The relationship was first identified in 2013 based on their nuclear genes. Historically these birds were placed at different parts of the tree, with tropicbirds in Pelecaniformes and the kagu and sunbittern in Gruiformes. Some genetic analyses have placed the eurypygimorph taxa in the controversial and obsolete clade Metaves, with uncertain placement within that group. More recent molecular studies support their grouping together in Eurypygimorphae, which is usually recovered as the sister taxon to Aequornithes within Ardeae.

References

Neognathae